Sharon Schuster Bulova  is an American politician who was chairman of the Fairfax County Board of Supervisors in Virginia. A Democrat, she was first elected chairman in a special election on February 3, 2009. Bulova was reelected in 2011 and again on November 3, 2015. She retired at the end of her last term in January 2020.

Early life
One of four children of Lawrence King Schuster, Sr. and the former Mary Suzanne Knox, Sharon Schuster grew up in Pikesville, Maryland, a suburb of Baltimore. In 1966, Schuster married scientist Richard T. Bulova and the couple moved to Fairfax County, where Richard worked at Fort Belvoir. After living in Woodbridge for a short time, in 1971, they moved back to Fairfax County, buying a house in the Kings Park West neighborhood of Fairfax.

Bulova was elected vice president of the Kings Park West Civic Association, then became president when the existing president moved to Korea. In 1984, Annandale District Supervisor Audrey Moore hired Bulova.

Political career
In 1987, Bulova was working as a legislative aide to Annandale District Supervisor Audrey Moore when Moore decided to challenge Republican Jack Herrity for the Chair of the Fairfax County Board of Supervisors. Moore encouraged Bulova to replace her on the Board; Bulova declared her candidacy in April 1987.

Bulova, a Democrat, defeated Republican D. Patrick Mullins for the Annandale District seat in the November 1987 election, and was sworn in the following January.

In 1988, Bulova became a member of the Northern Virginia Transportation Commission.

In her first term as supervisor, Bulova focused on transportation, environmental and educational issues. One of her major projects, which she had begun working on while still on Audrey Moore's staff, was the Virginia Railway Express commuter rail service.

Bulova announced her run for a second term as supervisor in February 1991. Though Democratic chair Audrey Moore was deeply unpopular, and despite the Republican strategy of tying all the board's Democrats to deeply unpopular chair Audrey Moore, Bulova won reelection as supervisor from the renamed Braddock District in November 1991, defeating Paul E. Jenkins.

In her 1995 run, Bulova handily defeated the Republican candidate, restaurant owner Paul A. Romano, III.

Bulova was unopposed for her runs as Braddock District Supervisor in 1999 and 2003. She defeated Carey C. Campbell in the 2007 election for Braddock District supervisor with over 80% of the vote.

The election of Gerry Connolly as congressman from Virginia's 11th congressional district in November 2008 necessitated a special election to fill the Chairman's seat on the  Board of Supervisors. In the February 3, 2009 special election, Bulova defeated her challengers, Republican Springfield District Supervisor Pat S. Herrity, as well as Independent Green Carey C. Campbell and independent Christopher F. DeCarlo.

On November 3, 2015, Bulova was reelected as chairman of the Board of Supervisors, defeating Republican Arthur G. Purves and Independent Green Glenda Gail Parker.

In November 2011, Bulova received the Tower of Dulles award from the Committee for Dulles for her work to bring Metrorail to Dulles International Airport.

Community efforts

In 2011, Bulova initiated a Private Sector Energy Task Force consisting of corporate, institutional, and community leaders. The task force was charged with defining a strategy to position Fairfax County as a leader in the areas of energy efficiency, sustainability, and green technology.

The Business Roundtable Discussion Group was put together by Bulova to identify strategies for accelerating economic recovery in Fairfax County.  In addition, the group is tasked with finding new economic development opportunities that include energy efficiency, conservation, and affordable housing strategies.

Bulova put together a task force for the Fairfax County Asian American History Project.  In May 2010, this task force produced a book and a website which captures the history of Asian-Americans in Fairfax County.

Bulova founded the Faith Communities in Action.  This countywide network encourages faith communities and charitable non-profit organizations to work in partnership with local government to better respond to the needs of the community.

References

External links

Sharon Bulova

Living people
Virginia Democrats
Women in Virginia politics
Members of the Fairfax County Board of Supervisors
1947 births
21st-century American politicians
21st-century American women politicians